Founded in 2002, Optelian Access Networks Corporation (Optelian) is a privately owned and operated Intuitive Packet Optical Networking company. Optelian has two headquarters – one in Ottawa, Ontario (Canada) and the other in Marietta, Georgia (U.S.). The company has both product development and local manufacturing based in Ottawa. Initially producing passive networking components, Optelian has added active products for service providers, wireless applications, utilities, research and education, cloud and data center, or any other enterprise.

In 2012, Deloitte ranked Optelian as #39 on Canadian Fast 50 and #302 on North American Fast 500. Optelian has also won the Ottawa Business Journal Top 10 Fastest Growing Companies in Ottawa award for 2011, 2012 and 2013.

History
In 2002, Dave Weymouth and Mike Perry founded Optelian after realizing that there was a gap they could fill in the optical transport market.  The company began creating passive optical components, and then expanded to active solutions, including packet optical networking, based on customer feedback.

Optelian now designs and develops optical transport network components for over 200 service providers, utilities, research and development, data center and cloud, and other enterprises in North America and around the world. Optelian has delivered more than 20,000 systems with over 300,000 wavelengths installed.

Versawave - division of Optelian
In January 2012, Optelian acquired Versawave Technologies Inc., of Vancouver, British Columbia, a leader in the field of ultra-high bandwidth gallium arsenide based optical modulators with patented polarization modulation technology.

Acquisition by DZS 
On February 08, 2021, DZS completed its acquisition of Optelian, less than a month after the announcement that DZS had entered into a definitive agreement to acquire Optelian on January 20, 2021.

North American manufacturing
Optelian both designs and manufactures optical components in the Ottawa, Ontario location.

Products and services
Optelian’s products are organized into categories that fall within the Optelian FLEX Architecture. Prior to the introduction of the Optelian FLEX Architecture, all of the products were divided into LightGAIN, which largely represented active components, and LightMUX, which mostly covered passive components. However, as the active product portfolio grew a single category was not sufficient to distinguish where the components fit within the operator’s network.

Optelian leadership

David Weymouth – Chief Executive Office and Co-founder
Mike Perry – Strategic Advisor and Co-founder
Dr. Sheldon Walklin – Chief Technology Officer
Dave Mills – Vice President of Sales and Services
Brenda Snarr – Vice President of Finance
Dennis Isotti – Vice President of Operations

See also
 Optical communication
 ROADM
 Wavelength Division Multiplexing
 OSI model

References

Companies based in Ontario
Privately held companies based in Georgia (U.S. state)
Companies established in 2002
Companies based in Cobb County, Georgia